In Euclidean geometry, Musselman's theorem is a property of certain circles defined by an arbitrary triangle.

The common point  is point  in Clark Kimberling's list of triangle centers.

History 
The theorem was proposed as an advanced problem by John Rogers Musselman and René Goormaghtigh in 1939, and a proof was presented by them in 1941.  A generalization of this result was stated and proved by Goormaghtigh.

Goormaghtigh’s generalization 
The generalization of Musselman's theorem by Goormaghtigh does not mention the circles explicitly.

Let  be the projection of the circumcenter  on the line , and  the point on  such that .

References
  

Theorems about triangles and circles